Sveta Lucija may refer to several places in Slovenia:

Lucija, Piran, a settlement in the Municipality of Piran, known as Sveta Lucija until 1961
Most na Soči, a settlement in the Municipality of Tolmin, known as Sveta Lucija ob Soči  until 1955
Zadnja Vas, a settlement in the Municipality of Radovljica, known as Sveta Lucija until 1955